Steamie may refer to:
 A Montreal hot dog, also known as a steamie
 The Steamie, a play by Tony Roper
 A public, communal laundry - see